Humboldt Beginnings is the fourth studio album by the Pharcyde, released in 2004.

Production
The group was down to two original members for the recording of Humboldt Beginnings: Bootie Brown and Imani.  Two additional rappers, Spaceboyboogie X and "Greg" Smooche, appear on several tracks.

Critical reception
AllMusic wrote that "the frequent weed songs are interspersed with club thumpers ('The Uh-Huh'), smooth '80s-influenced lovers tracks ('Knew U,' 'Right B4'), and one of the most hilariously overblown gangsta tracks (perhaps humorous?) ever performed ('Bongloads II')." The Cleveland Scene wrote that "the ganjacentric album ... at least acknowledges the stoned-soul picnic that inspired the band's greatest moments." Phoenix New Times wrote that "tight, innovative production and clean, crisp flows contribute to a distinctly original nuance that helps separate the disc further from the group's previous efforts."

Track listing

 "Intro: Homegrown" (2:18)
 Produced by The Pharcyde
 "The Uh-Huh" (2:55)
 Produced by 88 Keys
 "Storm" (3:38)
 Produced by Spaceboy Boogie X
 "Skit" (0:11)
 "Knew U" (3:11)
 Produced by Spaceboy Boogie X
 "Skit" (0:20)
 "The Art of Sharing" (2:48)
 Produced by The Pharcyde
 "Bongloads II" (3:52)
 Produced by Spaceboy Boogie X
 "Skit" (0:11)
 "Rules & Regulations" (4:38)
 Produced by Spaceboy Boogie X
 "Skit" (0:15)
 "Illusions" (3:46)
 Produced by the Pharcyde
 "Mixedgreens" (4:05)
 Vocals by Destani Wolf, Dee
 Produced by Spaceboy Boogie X
 "Right B4" (3:49)
 Produced by Spaceboy Boogie X
 "Clouds" (1:55)
 Produced by Spaceboy Boogie X
 "Skit" (0:41)
 "The Bomb" (3:36)
 Produced by Spaceboy Boogie X
 "The Climb/Paranoia" (4:07)
 Produced by The Pharcyde
 "Skit" (0:41)
 "Choices" (4:14)
 Produced by 88 Keys
 "Skit" (0:54)
 "Dedication" (5:33)
 Produced by The Pharcyde
 "Outro: Praise" (2:10)/"Fastlife" (4:06)
 Produced by Spaceboy Boogie X

Personnel

Singles

References

The Pharcyde albums
2004 albums
Albums produced by 88-Keys